Glenfinnan is a hamlet in Lochaber area of the Highlands of Scotland. In 1745 the Jacobite rising began here when Prince Charles Edward Stuart ("Bonnie Prince Charlie") raised his standard on the shores of Loch Shiel. Seventy years later, the 18 m (60 ft) Glenfinnan Monument, at the head of the loch, was erected to commemorate the historic event.

Jacobite rising 

Prince Charles landed from France on Eriskay in the Western Isles, travelling to the mainland in a small rowing boat, coming ashore at Loch nan Uamh just west of Glenfinnan. On arrival on the Scottish mainland, he was met by a small number of MacDonalds. Stuart waited at Glenfinnan as more MacDonalds, Camerons, Macfies, and MacDonnells arrived.

On 19 August 1745, after Prince Charles judged he had enough military support, he climbed the hill near Glenfinnan as MacMaster of Glenaladale raised his royal standard. The Young Pretender announced to all the mustered clans he claimed the British throne in the name of his father James Stuart ('the Old Pretender'). A MacPhee (Macfie) was one of two pipers with Bonnie Prince Charlie as he raised his banner above Glenfinnan. After claiming the throne, brandy was distributed to the assembled highlanders to celebrate the occasion.

Eight months later, the Jacobite claim to the throne ended in failure at the Battle of Culloden on 16 April 1746. Many Macfies from Glenfinnan followed Donald Cameron of Lochiel on the right flank of the Jacobite Army at the battle.

Charles Stuart returned to the area after Culloden during his flight to evade the Government troopers of Prince William, Duke of Cumberland. After taking refuge with loyal supporters, he boarded a French frigate on the shores of Loch nan Uamh close to where he landed and raised his standard the previous year. The Young Pretender died in Rome in 1788 without setting foot on Scottish soil again. The Prince's Cairn marks the spot from where he departed into exile.

Monument 

By 1815, the Jacobite cause was no longer a political threat to the Hanoverian monarchy. Alexander Macdonald of Glenaladale, a minor branch of the Clan Donald, built a memorial tower at Glenfinnan to commemorate the raising of the standard of the Young Pretender. The tower, which is 18 metres in height, was designed by the Scottish architect James Gillespie Graham. The statue of an anonymous highlander, referred to at the point of commission as Charles Edward Stewart, by John Greenshields, was added in 1835.

Railway

Station 
 is about halfway between Fort William and Mallaig on the picturesque West Highland Railway. Along with a regular rail service by ScotRail, the line is used by the Jacobite steam train. A private railway museum operates at the station, using the former booking-office, the disused signalbox, and some stored coaches.

Viaduct 
Sir Robert McAlpine constructed the Glenfinnan Viaduct between 1897 and 1898. To commemorate the viaduct's centenary in 1997, a plaque was unveiled at the base of one of its arches.

The landscape in which the viaduct is located has made it popular with film producers. In 1969, it was used in Ring of Bright Water, starring Bill Travers and Virginia McKenna. 
It has since come to prominence in the cinematic releases of the Harry Potter series. The Hogwarts Express, is filmed crossing the viaduct in several of the films beginning with Harry Potter and the Chamber of Secrets in 2002. The train filmed is the Jacobite Steam-Locomotive Train, a tourist train.

In popular culture 
In the Highlander universe, Connor and Duncan MacLeod are both Scots born in Glenfinnan in 1518 and 1592, respectively. Eilean Donan castle is used as a stand-in for Glenfinnan in the franchise.

References

External links 

Welcome to Glenfinnan
29 large image slide show of Glenfinnan for phones to 60 inch TVs
Photographs and Information from Strolling Guides
Glenfinnan Community Council

Populated places in Lochaber